Crepidium purpureiflorum is a member of the family Orchidaceae endemic to the Philippines.

Description

Taxonomy

Distribution and habitat

Ecology
found in

References

purpureiflorum
Orchids of the Philippines